For the cinematographic term relating to film technique, see Two shot.

Two Shots is the second studio album by Canadian jazz singer Matt Dusk. It was released globally by Decca Records on June 15, 2004. The album was primarily produced by Robin Smith, Nigel Lowis, and Terry Sawchuk. 
Two Shots was very successful in Canada, where it was certified gold. It also was released with modest success in the United States, reaching number ten on the Billboard Top Contemporary Jazz albums chart.

Critical reception

Aaron Latham of AllMusic gave praise to Dusk's Rat Pack homage on the opening track, "The Theme From Loaded Gun" and "Five" but felt he relied too much on it to form his own musical identity and didn't give the rest of the track listing "an indelible impression", concluding that "this does not mean that Two Shots is not worthy of a listen as it is a quality debut that will appeal to anyone who enjoys pop standards. But if he can sift out the ghosts of the past and find his own voice in these songs, he has the chance to create a disc that truly showcases the unique talent of Matt Dusk."

Track listing

Charts

References

2004 albums
Matt Dusk albums
Decca Records albums